Grihapravesham is a 1992 Malayalam film directed by Mohan Kupleri. This is the debut movie of Mohan Kupleri. Jagadish, Siddique, Jagathy Sreekumar, Rekha etc. played the main roles in the movie. The movie is about a wrong couple who get married in Guruvayoor temple due to a mix-up. The movie was produced by Chandran Kilimanoor under the banner of Shree Bhuvaneshwari Movie Arts and was distributed by Film Mates. The story, screenplay and dialogue was handled by Mani Shoranur .

Cast 
 Jagadish as Kannan
 Rekha as Radhika
 Siddique as Hari
 Jagathy Sreekumar as Govindan
 Thilakan as Radhika's father
 Devan as Madhavankutty
 Sai Kumar as Rakesh
 Mamukkoya as Raman Nair
 Geetha Vijayan as Thulasi
 Unnimary as Kamalu
 Sukumari as Parvathyamma
 Zeenath as Radhika's friend
 Zainuddin as Sugathakumaran
 Shyama as Sudha
 Jose Pellissery as Advocate, Sudha's Father

Music 
S. Balakrishnan composed the songs of the movie which were written by O. N. V. Kurup. The music was distributed by Tharangini.

 Songs
 "Aavanippadamakale nilavu peytha raav poyi" – K. J. Yesudas
 "Panineerin manamulla noor thechu" – K. J. Yesudas
 "Aavanippadamakale nilavu peytha raav poyi" –  K. S. Chithra

External links 
 Grihaprevesam in MMDb
 

1992 films
1990s Malayalam-language films
Guruvayur
Films set in Kerala
Films shot in Thrissur
Films directed by Mohan Kupleri